Pironchamps is a town of Wallonia and a district of the municipality of Farciennes, located in the province of Hainaut, Belgium.

It was a municipality before 1977.

References

Former municipalities of Hainaut (province)